Fish Creek (called Tege-soken, "between the mouths" by the Haudenosaunee) is a moderately sized river emptying into the eastern end of Oneida Lake in Oneida County, New York. The last mile of the creek is channelized to form part of the Erie Canal, which joins the lake at Sylvan Beach.

The largest tributary of Oneida Lake, Fish Creek contributes about 50% of the lake's total inflow.

Geography
Excepting the east and west branches, the only major tributary that joins Fish Creek proper is Wood Creek, which enters from the east via the Erie Canal. Nearly all of the watershed is rural, with the only significant towns being (from roughly north-to-south) Florence, Williamstown, Camden, Annsville, and Vienna. The East Branch contributes about 46% of the total flow in Fish Creek; the West Branch 42%; and Wood Creek, about 12%.

East Branch
It flows generally south, receiving Sucker Brook from the east and entering a narrow gorge, where it is impounded in the small City of Rome Reservoir. Below the reservoir it is joined by Florence Creek from the west, before flowing past Taberg to its mouth and confluence with the West Branch.

West Branch
The West Branch rises in marshes near Williamstown in eastern Oswego County and flows in a generally southeasterly direction. At Camden in Oneida County it is joined by the Mad River from the north, and is joined by Cobb Brook shortly below there, also from the north. Continuing southeast it receives the Little River from the west and passes McConnellsville, then flows east to its confluence with the East Branch.

Discharge
Most of the water in Fish Creek originates as snowmelt from the Tug Hill, a region renowned for its extremely heavy winter snowfall. Flows usually peak in April while reaching the yearly minimum during July and August. High flows during the winter (November through March) are typically the result of rainfall.

There is no stream gage on the Fish Creek proper, although the U.S. Geological Survey (USGS) operates gages on both the East and West Branches. Combined with inflows from Wood Creek, the total flow of Fish Creek into Oneida Lake exceeds .

History

The name of Fish Creek may originate from the annual fishing feast once held by the Oneida people at the confluence of the East and West forks. During the spring stakes were placed across the width of the creek to support a temporary brush dam. The Indians then drove all the fish (including prodigious runs of Atlantic salmon) from upstream down to the barrier before a second brush dam was constructed to trap them, at which point they were easily collected with spears and nets. The subsequent feast was divided equally between every family in the tribe.

After the construction of dams on the Oswego River, which carries the outflow of Oneida Lake (the Oneida River) to Lake Ontario, the St. Lawrence River and the Atlantic Ocean, salmon disappeared from Fish Creek, although they were reintroduced in 1997.

Human use
The East Branch is dammed once at Kessinger Dam, completed in 1909, which provides part of the water supply for nearby Rome. Water is diverted through a 1 mile (1.6 km) tunnel and a  pipeline to various reservoirs around the city. A smaller tributary, Florence Creek, has also been dammed at Glenmore since 1926 to provide water to the city of Oneida.

Recreation
The upper part of the East Branch is stocked with brook trout, while many other reaches of the East and West Branches have good fishing for wild brook, brown and rainbow. Between Point Rock and Taberg, the East Branch flows through a steep gorge known for its difficult whitewater. The  stretch, sometimes known as the "River of No Return", is rated class II–IV by American Whitewater. Part of the East Branch was considered for National Wild and Scenic Rivers System designation in 1978, but was not passed due to a lack of local support.

See also
List of rivers of New York

Notes

References

Rivers of New York (state)